

People 

Stollery is a surname. Notable people with the surname include:

Christopher Stollery (born 1965), Australian television actor
David Stollery (born 1941), former American child actor and, as an adult, an industrial designer
Karl Stollery (born 1987), Canadian ice hockey player
Pete Stollery (born 1960), British composer, specialising in electroacoustic music
Peter Stollery (born 1935), Canadian politician and businessman

Organizations 
 Stollery Children's Hospital